Chris Van Dusen is an American television producer and screenwriter. He is the creator and executive producer of the television series Bridgerton, and served as showrunner for seasons one and two.

Van Dusen worked on Grey's Anatomy from 2005 to 2012, and, although uncredited, assisted in the transformation of Grey's Anatomy into its spin-off, Private Practice.  He was also a producer and writer on ABC's The Catch and Scandal.

Personal life
A native of Maryland, Van Dusen graduated from Emory University before receiving his M.F.A. at the University of Southern California.  He and his husband have three daughters.

References

External links

American television writers
American male screenwriters
Year of birth missing (living people)
Living people
American male television writers
American people of Dutch descent
LGBT television producers
American LGBT screenwriters